The praetorian prefecture of the East, or of the Orient was one of four large praetorian prefectures into which the Late Roman Empire was divided. As it comprised the larger part of the Eastern Roman Empire, and its seat was at Constantinople, the praetorian prefect was the second most powerful man in the East, after the Emperor, in essence serving as his first minister.

Structure 

The Prefecture was established after the death of Constantine the Great in 337, when the empire was split up among his sons and Constantius II received the rule of the East, with a praetorian prefect as his chief aide. The part allotted to Constantius encompassed four (later five) dioceses, each in turn comprising several provinces. The authority of the prefecture stretched from the Eastern Balkans, grouped into the Diocese of Thrace, to Asia Minor, divided into the dioceses of Asiana and Pontus, and the Middle East, with the dioceses of Orient and Egypt.

List of known praefecti praetorio Orientis 
 Pompeius Probus
 Ablabius (329-337/338)
 Septimius Acindynus (338–340)
 Philippus (344–351)
 Thalassius (? - 354)
 Domitianus (354)
 Strategius Musonianus (354–358)
 Flavius Hermogenes (358-360)
 Helpidius (360)
 Saturninius Secundus Salutius (361 until some years into the reign of Valentinian)
 Nebridius
 Domitius Modestus (369–377)
 Quintus Clodius Hermogenianus Olybrius (379)
 Neoterius (380-381)
 Maternus Cynegius (384–388)
 Eutolmius Tatianus (388–392)
 Flavius Rufinus (392, September 10 – 395, November 27)
 Caesarius (1st time, 395, November 30 – 397, July 13)
 Eutychianus (1st time, 397, September 4 – 399, July 25)
 Aurelianus (1st time, 399, August 17 – October 2)
 possibly Eutychianus (2nd time, 399, December 11 – 400, July 12)
 Caesarius (2nd time, 400–403)
 Eutychianus (3rd time, 404–405)
 Flavius Anthemius (405–414)
 Monaxius (1st time, 10 May – 30 November 414)
 Aurelianus (2nd time, 414–416)
 Monaxius (2nd time, 26 August 416 – 27 May 420)
 Eustathius (420–422)
 Asclepiodotus (423–425)
 Aetius (425)
 Hierius (1st time, 425–428)
 Flavius Florentius (1st time, 428–430)
 Antiochus Chuzon (430–431)
 Rufinus (431–432)
 Hierius (2nd time, 432)
 Flavius Taurus (1st time, 433–434)
 Anthemius Isidorus (435–436)
 Darius (436–437)
 Flavius Florentius (2nd time, c. 438–439)
 Flavius Taurus Seleucus Cyrus (439–441)
 Thomas (442)
 Apollonius (442–443)
 Zoilus (444)
 Hermocrates (444)
 Flavius Taurus (2nd time, 445)
 Flavius Constantinus (first term, c. 447)
 Antiochus (448)
 Flavius Florentius Romanus Protogenes (448–449)
 Hormisdas (449–450)
 Palladius (450–455)
 Flavius Constantinus (second term, 456)
 Flavius Constantinus (third term, 459)
 Flavius Antoninus Messala Vivianus (459–460)
 Pusaeus (465)
 Amasius (c. 469)
 Matronianus (491)
 Hierius (494–496)
 Euphemius (496)
 Polycarpus (498)
 Constantine (1st time, 502)
 Appion (503)
 Leontius (503–504)
 Constantine (2nd time, 505)
 Eustathius (505–506)
 Zoticus (511–512)
 Marinus (1st time, c. 512–515)
 Sergius (517)
 Marinus (2nd time, 519)
 Demosthenes (520–524)
 Archelaus (524–527)
 Basilides (c. 527)
 Atarbius (c. 528)
 Iulianus (530–531)
 John the Cappadocian (1st time, 531–532)
 Phokas (533)
 John the Cappadocian (2nd time, 533–541)
 Flavius Comitas Theodorus Bassus (c. 541) as John's deputy
 Peter Barsymes (1st time, 543–546)
 Flavius Comitas Theodorus Bassus (c. 548)
 Addaeus (c. 551)
 Hephaestus (551–552)
 Areobindus (c. 553)
 Peter Barsymes (2nd time, 555–562)
 Diomedes (c. 572)
 Georgius (c. 598)
 Constantine Lardys (c. 602)

References

Sources 
 The Prosopography of the Later Roman Empire (PLRE), Vols. I-III: (Vol. II, pp. 1250–1252;)
 

 
7th-century disestablishments
337 establishments
4th century in the Byzantine Empire
5th century in the Byzantine Empire
6th century in the Byzantine Empire
7th century in the Byzantine Empire